The Frankenstrat, also known as "Frankie", is a guitar created by Eddie Van Halen. Its name is a portmanteau of Frankenstein, the fictional doctor who created a monster by combining body parts of the recently deceased, and the Stratocaster, a model of electric guitar made by Fender. 

The Frankenstrat was Van Halen's attempt to combine the sound of a classic Gibson guitar with the physical attributes and tremolo bar functionality of a Fender Stratocaster. An early version of a Superstrat, the guitar was made from a Northern Ash Stratocaster body, with pickup routing which Van Halen modified to fit a Gibson PAF humbucking pickup in the bridge position. The guitar has a maple neck and fretboard, chrome hardware, and was painted with a black-and-white striped design, then black and white stripes on a red background. It has a standard six-string setup and a Floyd Rose tremolo.

In April 2019, the Metropolitan Museum of Art displayed the Frankenstrat guitar as part of the "Play It Loud: Instruments of Rock and Roll" exhibit. A copy of the Frankenstrat is housed in the National Museum of American History, part of the Smithsonian Institution in Washington, D.C.

Design

Body

Van Halen bought the Frankenstrat's northern ash body and maple neck (which was a factory reject) for $130 from Wayne Charvel and Lynn Ellsworth, who sold Boogie Body bodies and necks. Van Halen was able to purchase the factory second body at a discount price of $50 due to a knot in the wood. The $80 neck had jumbo fret wire, and its truss rod was adjustable at the heel. 

Luthier Donny Ward concluded that Ellsworth, who was primarily a furniture maker, was in no position to mass-produce the first 100-body order from Charvel, and so received help from the Schecter guitar factory in the San Fernando Valley.

Bridge and pickup

The guitarist originally used the Fender tremolo system from his 1961 Fender Stratocaster, adding the Floyd Rose later. He equipped the Frankenstrat with a PAF ("patent applied for") pickup removed from his Gibson ES-335, potting the pickup in paraffin wax to reduce microphonic feedback. He then screwed the pickup to the guitar in the bridge position, slightly offset from perpendicular to the strings, to compensate for the different string spacing between the Gibson's pickup and the Fender's bridge. This pickup was later replaced by a Seymour Duncan humbucker.

Controls

Van Halen removed both tone-control potentiometers, wiring the pickups in a simple circuit largely due to his limited knowledge of electronics. He placed a knob marked "Tone" on the volume-control pot, then used a vinyl record that he'd shaped into a pickguard to cover the controls. This pickguard was later replaced by a real, similarly shaped pickguard. Although it has five mounting holes (one drilled by Van Halen), it was installed with only three screws. A strip of double-sided masking tape was added near the pickguard, on which Van Halen placed a variety of picks. The simple circuit consisted of a single humbucking pick-up, an A500k potentiometer (the volume control) and a 1/4-inch output jack.

Finish

Van Halen painted the guitar black, and when it was dry he put strips of gaffer's tape on the body and repainted it white, creating the classic Frankenstrat. Van Halen put a Gibson decal on the headstock, emphasizing the "cross-pollination" between Gibson and Fender. Because companies began selling guitars with similar finishes, and because he felt that the guitar was being too badly damaged from overuse, he stopped playing the Frankenstrat in public, instead using the black-and-yellow "bumblebee" guitar pictured on Van Halen II (1979). In 1979, disappointed with the bumblebee's performance, Van Halen re-taped the body of the Frankenstrat and painted it with red Schwinn bicycle paint. According to the guitarist, "The Schwinn bicycle paint gives it pop."

Upgrades

The Frankenstrat has gone through a number of necks over the years, and its bridge has evolved from the 1961 Fender tremolo to original Floyd Rose bridges (with and without fine tuners). The placement of the 1971 quarter was to keep the Floyd Rose bridge flush with the body, and Van Halen attached truck reflectors to the rear of the body so he could flip the guitar over to reflect stage lights onto the crowd. He installed large screw eyes instead of strap buttons, a foolproof method of securing the guitar to the strap.

During the late 1970s and early 1980s, many guitar companies tried to capitalize on Van Halen's popularity by manufacturing Frankenstrat replicas. In 1979, he replaced the original black pickguard with a white pickguard and added a Mighty Mite single coil with a red phenolic bobbin on neck. He later replaced the white pickguard with a cut up black vinyl record, covered the back with aluminum foil, and replaced the Gibson humbucker pickup with one from the "Bumblebee" guitar. In 1981, he replaced the vinyl record with a trimmed piece of a 3-ply black Fender pickguard to cover the control cavity. To confuse imitators, he screwed a three-way switch sideways into the middle position cavity, replaced the previous humbucker with a Seymour Duncan pickup, and replaced the neck with the "Bumblebee" guitar's. In an interview, Eddie admitted the single-coil pickup and middle switch were not connected to anything.

Variants

Kramer

Kramer Guitars was the first company endorsed by Van Halen in 1983, when it built a Frankenstrat replica, and during this time he replaced the original Frankenstrat neck with a prototype Kramer Pacer neck first seen during Van Halen's Hide Your Sheep Tour in January 1983. Later that year the Pacer neck was replaced with a Kramer "Banana" style neck first seen during Van Halen's performance at the US Festival and then in the "Jump" video. In 1984, he was given the "Hot for Teacher" guitar (seen in the song's video clip), and began appearing in Kramer advertisements. Paul Unkert, the "Guitar Guy" of UNK guitars, worked on the Frankenstrat and put his "Unk" stamp on it.

The best-known Kramer owned by Van Halen was the 5150, which he built in the Kramer factory. Although it was thought that the guitar was made from a Kramer Baretta body, it had a prototype Pacer body. The guitar, used from the 1984 tour through the OU812 tour, was last used to record "Judgement Day" for the album For Unlawful Carnal Knowledge (1991). Although the 5150 reappeared on the 2004 reunion tour with Sammy Hagar, the guitar upgraded with a Charvel neck and EVH Wolfgang humbucker, it was subsequently retired.

A number of other Kramers were also built and used by Van Halen during this time (most notably the 1984 Kramer), although most were simply striped designs without other markings. These guitars were primarily backups for the 5150 on tours, and were retired at the same time. Some were given away, or (like the 1984 Kramer) awarded in contests.

Charvel hybrid VH2

The second Frankenstrat, appearing on the Van Halen II LP and tour, was a 1979 Charvel hybrid VH2 "Bumblebee" black-and-yellow striped guitar. Anecdotally it was buried with Dimebag Darrell of Pantera in a Kiss Kasket, who had asked for a Charvel Art Series replica before they were released; Van Halen was said to have presented the original guitar at his funeral.

Ibanez Destroyer

This guitar was a 1976 Ibanez Destroyer made from Ash. The wood is often mistaken for korina because of the finished appearance of Ibanez model No. 2459.

Van Halen later removed a large chunk of the wood with a hacksaw, giving it an open-jaws shape. It was nicknamed the "Shark" because the chunk he cut out was serrated, resembling shark teeth. This guitar was used in the videos for "Runnin' with the Devil" and "You Really Got Me".

The removal of the wood however destroyed the guitar's sound and he retired it. To record "Women and Children First", Van Halen borrowed a Destroyer from the then-unknown musician Chris Holmes.

Fender-Charvel

Charvel introduced a signature-model Eddie Van Halen guitar, the Charvel EVH Art Series Guitar equipped with a single custom-wound pickup and a Floyd Rose locking tremolo, in three colors: white with black stripes, black with yellow stripes and red with black-and-white stripes. The guitars have a neck profile similar to the original Frankenstrat.

Three hundred replicas of the red-and-black-and-white-striped Frankenstrat were offered by Van Halen's EVH brand for $25,000 each. About 180 were sold in the United States, and the remainder overseas. In 2018, Fender-EVH added the '78 Eruption model, followed by the 2019 '79 Bumblebee replica. All three guitars are meticulously recreated to include parts as close to the original as possible. Van Halen himself has stated that the red-black-white Frankenstrat replicas feel and sound better than the original guitar built in the 1970s.

Guitar Hero: Van Halen

The Frankenstrat's paintjob was used in the box art for Guitar Hero: Van Halen. It also appears a number of times in the game, including transitions at the end of songs; the stripes appear one by one in quick succession, and are then removed.

2012 tour

For the band's 2012 tour, Van Halen used a variant of the Frankenstrat with the black-and-white capped-bridge pickup from his Wolfgang models, a maple Wolfgang neck with a black headstock and a Wolfgang-style volume knob, this guitar is replica of his original Frankenstrat.

EVH

In 2013 Van Halen's brand, EVH, released a line of Fender USA-manufactured replicas based on previous Frankenstrats. There are three, based on the Charvel "Bumblebee", the original pick-guarded Frankenstrat and the red, white and black Frankenstrat, with hardware similar to that of the EVH Wolfgangs.

Capitalising on these replica guitars, EVH and Fender later released a more budget-friendly Frankenstrat replica (named "Franky") under the Striped Series moniker, which are manufactured in Fender's Ensenada, Mexico facility. EVH also sells a Frankenstrat replica pickup, which they claim was wired to the same specs as Van Halen's original PAF.

See also

 List of guitars

References

External links

Fender Stratocasters
Individual guitars
Instruments of musicians
Van Halen